Abdo Ali Al-Edresi (Arabic: عبده علي الادريسي; born 16 February 1986) is a Yemeni football Midfield who is currently playing ، He is also a member of the Yemen national under-17 football team. Al-Edresi played for Yemen at the 2003 FIFA U-17 World Championship in Finland.

Honours

Club
Al-Oruba'

Yemeni League: 1
 2010–11
Yemeni Super Cup: 1
 2011

Country
Yemen U17
FIFA U-17 World Cup
Group Stage: 2003
 AFC U-17 Championship
Runner-up: 2002 AFC U-17 Championship

References

External links 
 
 

1986 births
Living people
Yemeni footballers
Yemen international footballers
Yemeni expatriate footballers
Yemeni expatriate sportspeople in Saudi Arabia
Expatriate footballers in Saudi Arabia
Al-Oruba (Yemeni) players
Al Sha'ab Sana'a players
Hassan Abyan players
Al-Ahli Club Sana'a players
Al-Tilal SC players
Al-Watani Club players
Yemeni League players
Saudi First Division League players
Association football midfielders